The government of Los Angeles operates as a charter city (as opposed to a general law city) under the charter of the City of Los Angeles. The elected government is composed of the Los Angeles City Council with 15 city council districts and the mayor of Los Angeles, which operate under a mayor–council government, as well as several other elective offices. Under the California Constitution, all judicial, school, county, and city offices, including those of chartered cities, are nonpartisan. The current mayor is Karen Bass, the current city attorney is Hydee Feldstein Soto and the current city controller is Kenneth Mejia.

In addition, there are numerous departments and appointed officers such as the Los Angeles Police Department (LAPD), the Los Angeles Fire Department (LAFD), the Los Angeles Department of Transportation (LADOT), the Los Angeles Public Library (LAPL), the Los Angeles Department of Public Works (LADPW), and the Los Angeles Department of Water and Power (LADWP).

Organization
The government of the city of Los Angeles includes the following city officers:

 Mayor
 Members of the Council
 City Attorney
 City Clerk
 Controller
 Treasurer
 The members of the boards or commissions of the departments and the chief administrative officer of each department and office
 An executive director of the Board of Police Commissioners
 Other officers as prescribed by ordinance

Mayor

The mayor of Los Angeles is the chief executive officer of the city.  The officeholder is elected for a four-year term, and limited to serving no more than two terms. The 43rd and current mayor is Karen Bass.

City Council

The Los Angeles City Council is the governing body of Los Angeles. The council is composed of fifteen members elected from single-member districts for four-year terms and limited to three terms. The president of the council and the president pro tempore are chosen by the council at the first regular meeting after June 30 in odd-numbered years. An assistant president pro tempore is appointed by the president. The current president of the Los Angeles City Council is Paul Krekorian, the president pro tempore is Mitch O'Farrell and the assistant president pro tempore is Vacant.

Regular council meetings are held in the City Hall on Tuesdays, Wednesdays and Fridays at 10 am except on holidays or if decided by special resolution.

Police Department

The Los Angeles Police Department (LAPD) polices the city of Los Angeles. It is governed by the Los Angeles Board of Police Commissioners and the Chief of the Los Angeles Police Department.

The city also maintains specialized police agencies;  the Port Police, within the Harbor Department (which is responsible for land, air and sea law enforcement services at the Port of Los Angeles), Los Angeles City Park Rangers, within the Parks and Recreation Department (which are responsible for security and fire protection in Griffith Park), and the Airport Police, within the Los Angeles World Airports Department (which is responsible for law enforcement services for the 2 city-owned airports; Los Angeles International Airport (LAX), and Van Nuys Airport (VNY)). The Los Angeles General Services Police, which provided police coverage for Los Angeles city owned property and parks (except for Griffith Park) was absorbed into the LAPD in 2012.  The Los Angeles Unified School District maintains its own separate police department,  as do many other school districts and college campuses within the city.

Neighborhood councils

The charter of the City of Los Angeles ratified by voters in 1999 created a system of advisory neighborhood councils that would represent the diversity of stakeholders, defined as those who live, work or own property in the neighborhood. The neighborhood councils are relatively autonomous and spontaneous in that they identify their own boundaries, establish their own bylaws, and elect their own officers. There are currently 99 neighborhood councils.

Other
The Los Angeles city attorney is an elected official whose job is legal counsel for the city and may prosecute misdemeanor criminal offenses within the city. The Los Angeles City Clerk is in charge of record-keeping for the city and elections. The Los Angeles City Controller is the elected auditor and chief accounting officer of the city. The Los Angeles City Treasurer handles financial matters.

In addition, there are numerous departments and appointed officers such as the:

 Economic & Workforce Development Department (EWDD)
 Housing Authority of the City of Los Angeles (HACLA)
 Los Angeles City Clerk
 Los Angeles Fire Department (LAFD)
 Los Angeles Housing + Community Investment Department (HCIDLA)
 Los Angeles Public Library (LAPL)
 Los Angeles Department of Public Works (LADPW)
 Los Angeles Department of Recreation and Parks
 Los Angeles Department of Transportation (LADOT)
 Los Angeles Department of Water and Power (LADWP)
 Los Angeles World Airports
 Los Angeles Airport Police
 Los Angeles International Airport
 Van Nuys Airport
 Office of Finance
 Port of Los Angeles
 Los Angeles Port Police

Elections
The most recent elections were in May 2013, with 13th district city councilman Eric Garcetti defeating city controller Wendy Greuel for Mayor. The voter turnout was about 19% of registered voters, one of the lowest turnouts on record, with Garcetti garnering about 54% of the votes.

Politics
Los Angeles has voted for every Democratic Party candidate for president since at least 1964. In the seven presidential elections since George H.W. Bush's re-election bid in 1992, no Republican candidate has received as much as 30% of the vote in Los Angeles.

Law

The charter of the City of Los Angeles is the founding document of Los Angeles. Pursuant to its charter, all legislative power is vested in the council and is exercised by ordinance subject to a veto by the Mayor.

Pursuant to this power, the council has caused to be promulgated the Administrative Code, consisting of administrative and procedural ordinances, and the Municipal Code, consisting of codified regulatory and penal ordinances. Violations of the ordinances are misdemeanor crimes unless otherwise specified as an infraction and may be prosecuted by city authorities.

Other governments

California 

The Los Angeles Superior Court, which covers the entire county, is not a county department but a division of the State's trial court system. Historically, the courthouses were county-owned buildings that were maintained at county expense, which created significant friction since the trial court judges, as officials of the state government, had to lobby the county Board of Supervisors for facility renovations and upgrades. In turn, the state judiciary successfully persuaded the state Legislature to authorize the transfer of all courthouses to the state government in 2008 and 2009 (so that judges would have direct control over their own courthouses). Courthouse security is still provided by the county government under a contract with the state.

Los Angeles County

Los Angeles is also part of Los Angeles County, for which the government of Los Angeles County is defined and authorized under the California Constitution, California law, and the charter of the County of Los Angeles. The county government provides countywide services such as elections and voter registration, law enforcement, jails, vital records, property records, tax collection, public health, and social services. The county government is primarily composed of the elected five-member Board of Supervisors, other elected offices including the sheriff, district attorney, and assessor, and numerous county departments and entities under the supervision of the chief executive officer. The majority of the county department headquarters are physically located within the city of Los Angeles.

See also

 Government of New York City

Notes

References

External links
 
 City Charter, Rules, and Codes
 Data portal